Nicosia (romanized: Nikosia; Cypriot Arabic: Nikusiya) is the largest city, capital, and seat of government of Cyprus. It is located near the centre of the Mesaoria plain, on the banks of the River Pedieos.

According to Greek mythology, Nicosia ( in Greek) was a siren, one of the daughters of Acheloos and Melpomene and its name translates as "White State" or city of White Gods.

Nicosia is the southeasternmost of all EU member states' capitals. It has been continuously inhabited for over 4,500 years and has been the capital of Cyprus since the 10th century. The Greek Cypriot and Turkish Cypriot communities of Nicosia segregated into the south and north of the city respectively in early 1964, following the fighting of the Cyprus crisis of 1963–64 that broke out in the city. This separation became a militarised border between the internationally recognised Republic of Cyprus and the self declared "TRNC" after Turkey invaded the island of Cyprus in 1974, illegally occupying the north of the island, including northern Nicosia.

Apart from its legislative and administrative functions, Nicosia has established itself as the island's financial capital and its main international business centre. In 2018, Nicosia was the 32nd richest city in the world in relative purchasing power.

Toponymy 
The earliest mention of Nicosia is in the clay prism of the Assyrian king Esarhaddon in 672 BC. This is a mention to the city-state of Ledra located on the site of Nicosia, and the city is named "Lidir". The name Ledra and variations (such as Ledroi) remained in use as late as 392 AD, when it was used in writing by Saint Jerome. However, that text also refers the city as "Leucotheon", and early Christian sources of this period are the first to use similar variations of the name Lefkosia (e.g. Leuteonos). The origin of the name "Lefkosia" is considered by scholars to be a "toponymic puzzle". The name is recorded in the majority of Byzantine sources as "Leukousia", and it is accepted in literature that the name "most probably" derives from the Greek phrase "leuke ousia" ("white estate").

History

Ancient times
Nicosia has been in continuous habitation since the beginning of the Bronze Age 2500 years BC, when the first inhabitants settled in the fertile plain of Mesaoria. Nicosia later became a city-state known as Ledra or Ledrae, one of the twelve kingdoms of ancient Cyprus built by Achaeans after the end of the Trojan War.  Remains of old Ledra today can be found in the Ayia Paraskevi hill in the south east of the city. Only one king of Ledra is known: Onasagoras. The kingdom of Ledra was destroyed early. Under Assyrian rule of Cyprus, Onasagoras was recorded as paying tribute to Esarhaddon of Assyria in 672 BC. By 330 BC, Ledra was recorded to be a small unimportant town. It is thought that the settlement was economically and politically dependent on the nearby town of Chytri. The main activity of the town inhabitants was farming. During this era, Ledra did not have the huge growth that the other Cypriot coastal towns had, which was primarily based on trade.

Ancient and Medieval Roman times
In the 4th century AD, the town became the seat of bishopric, with bishop Saint Tryphillius (Trifillios), a student of Saint Spyridon. Archaeological evidence indicates that the town regained much of its earlier significance in the early Christian period, and the presence of two or three basilicas with opus sectile decorations, along with marbles decorated with high relief indicate the presence of a relatively prosperous and sophisticated Christian society.

After the destruction of Salamis, the existing capital of Cyprus, by Arab raids in 647, along with extensive damage to other coastal settlements, the economy of the island became much more inward-looking and inland towns gained relative significance. Nicosia benefited from this and functioned as an outlet of the agricultural products from its hinterland, the Mesaoria plain. It further was at an advantageous position due to its ample water supply. As such, the town developed enough for the Byzantine Empire to choose Nicosia as the capital of the island around 965, when Cyprus rejoined the Byzantine Empire. The Byzantines moved the island's administration seat to Nicosia primarily for security reasons as coastal towns were often suffering from raids. From that point on it has remained as the capital of Cyprus. Nicosia was the seat of the Byzantine governor of Cyprus; the last Byzantine governor was Isaac Komnenos, who declared himself emperor of the island and ruled the island from 1183 to 1191. Testimony as late as 1211 indicates that Nicosia was not a walled city at that point and thus that the Byzantines did not build a city wall, thinking that the city's inland location would be sufficient for defense purposes. The Byzantines did, however, build a relatively weak fort within the city. The economy under Byzantine rule consisted mostly of the trading of agricultural goods, but the town also produced luxury items and metalware due to the presence of the imperial administration.

Medieval times

On his way to the Holy Land during the Third Crusade in 1187, Richard I of England's fleet was plagued by storms. He himself stopped first at Crete and then at Rhodes. Three ships continued on, one of which was carrying Joan of England, Queen of Sicily and Berengaria of Navarre, Richard's bride-to-be. Two of the ships were wrecked off Cyprus, but the ship bearing Joan and Berengaria made it safely to Limassol. Joan refused to come ashore, fearing she would be captured and held hostage by Isaac Komnenos of Cyprus, who hated all Franks. Her ship sat at anchor for a full week before Richard finally arrived on 8 May. Outraged at the treatment of his sister and his future bride, Richard invaded.

Richard laid siege to Nicosia, finally met and defeated Isaac Komnenos at Tremetousia and became ruler of the island, but sold it to the Knights Templar.

The Frankish rule of Cyprus started from 1192 and lasted until 1489. During this time, Nicosia was the capital of the medieval Kingdom of Cyprus, the seat of Lusignan kings, the Latin Church and the Frankish administration of the island. During the Frankish rule, the walls of the city were built along with many other palaces and buildings, including the gothic St. Sophia Cathedral. The tombs of the Lusignan kings can be found there. The exonym Nicosia appeared with the arrival of the Lusignans. The French-speaking Crusaders either could not, or did not care to, pronounce the name Lefkosia, and tended to say "Nicosie" translated into Italian and then internationally known as "Nicosia".

In 1373/4, Nicosia was occupied and ravaged by the Republic of Genoa and in 1426 from the Mamluk Sultanate.

In 1489, when Cyprus came under the rule of the Republic of Venice, Nicosia became their administrative centre and the seat of the Republic. The Venetian Governors saw it as a necessity for all the cities of Cyprus to be fortified due to the Ottoman threat. In 1567 Venetians built the new fortifications of Nicosia, which are well-preserved still to this day, demolishing the old walls built by the Franks as well as other important buildings of the Frankish era including the King's Palace, other private palaces and churches and monasteries of both Orthodox and Latin Christians. The new walls took the shape of a star with eleven bastions. The design of the bastion is more suitable for artillery and a better control for the defenders. The walls have three gates, to the North Kyrenia Gate, to the west Paphos Gate and to the east Famagusta Gate. The river Pedieos used to flow through the Venetian walled city. In 1567 it was later diverted outside onto the newly built moat for strategic reasons, due to the expected Ottoman attack.

Ottoman rule

On 1 July 1570, the city came under the rule of the Ottomans. On 22 July, Piyale Pasha having captured Paphos, Limassol and Larnaca marched his army towards Nicosia and laid siege to the city. The city managed to last 40 days under siege until its fall on 9 September 1570. The story of the Cypriot martyr Arnaude de Rocas dates from the fall of Nicosia. Some 20,000 residents died during the siege and every church, public building, and palace was looted. Nicosia had an estimated population of 21,000 before the Ottoman conquest, and based on the Ottoman census data of 1572, the population had been reduced to 1,100–1,200. The devastation of the city was so extensive that for the few years after the conquest, a number of villages in the island had a larger population than Nicosia. The main Latin churches were converted into mosques, such as the conversion of the Saint Sophia Cathedral.

Nicosia was the seat of the Pasha, the Greek Archbishop, the Dragoman and the Qadi. The Palazzo del Governo of Venetian times became the seat of the Pasha, the governor of Cyprus, and the building was renamed as the Konak or Seraglio (Saray). The square outside was known as Seraglio Square or Sarayonu (literally front of the Saray), as it is known to the present day. The saray was demolished in 1904 and the present block of Government Offices built on the site.

When the newly settled Turkish population arrived they generally lived in the north of the old riverbed. Greek Cypriots remained concentrated in the south, where the Archbishopric of the Orthodox Church was built. Other ethnic minority groups such as the Armenians and Latins came to be settled near the western entry into the city at Paphos Gate.

The names of the 12 quarters into which Nicosia was originally divided at the time of the Ottoman Conquest are said to be derived from the 12 generals in command of divisions of the Ottoman army at the time. Each general being posted to a quarter, that quarter (with two exceptions) was known by his name as follows:

 General Ibrahim Pasha.
 General Mahmoud Pasha.
 General Ak Kavuk Pasha. (This is a nickname meaning "white cap".)
 General Koukoud Effendi.
 General Arab Ahmed Pasha.
 General Abdi Pasha, known as Chavush (Sergeant) from which rank he was probably promoted.
 General Haydar Pasha.
 General Karamanzade (son of a Caramanian, other names not given).
 General Yahya Pasha (now known as the Phaneromeni Quarter).
 General Daniel Pasha (name of quarter changed subsequently to Omerie in honour of the Caliph Omar who stayed there for a night when in Cyprus).
 Tophane (Artillery Barracks)
 Nebetkhane, meaning police station or quarters of the patrol.

The names of the generals in command of the last two-quarters have been lost:

Later the number of neighbourhoods was increased to 24. Each neighbourhood was organised around a mosque or a church, where mainly the respective Muslim and Christian communities lived.

British rule

Nicosia came under the rule of the United Kingdom on 5 July 1878 in consequence of the Cyprus Convention.

The old Ottoman administrative headquarters (the Saray) was replaced in 1904 by a new building containing Law Courts, the Land Registry, and the Forestry, Customs, and Nicosia Commissioner's Offices. Adjacent was the Nicosia Police headquarters, while opposite were the General Post Office and the Telegraph Office. A Venetian Column, previously in a fenced courtyard near the Saray, was restored on a new site in the summer of 1915 in the middle of Saray Square. The Nicosia column was presumably erected in compliment to the reigning Doge Francesco Donati about the year 1550.

Just after the British Occupation a Municipal Council was constituted in Nicosia in 1882 for the general administration of public affairs within the city and for a certain area without the walls, under the presidency of a Mayor. The first municipal offices were in Municipality Square (now the central municipal market), but in 1944 the offices were transferred temporarily to the d'Avila bastion and in 1952 this was made permanent with a decision to renovate the building.

In 1923 the municipal limits were extended further (see map) and this new area was divided among several of the existing intramural Neighbourhoods. In 1938 the boundary was extended to the present limits in the west and to the boundaries of Ayii Omoloyites, Palouriotissa, Kaimakli and Omorfita. In 1944 the village authority of Ayii Omoloyites was absorbed, then, shortly after independence, Palouriotissa, Kaimakli and Omorfita were annexed to the city in 1968.

In 1955 an armed struggle against British rule began aiming to unite the island with Greece, Enosis. The struggle was led by EOKA, a Greek Cypriot nationalist military resistance organisation, and supported by the vast majority of Greek Cypriots. The unification with Greece failed and instead the independence of Cyprus was declared in 1960. During the period of the struggle, Nicosia was the scene of violent protests against British rule.

Independence and division

In 1960, Nicosia became the capital of the Republic of Cyprus, a state established by the Greek and Turkish Cypriots. In 1963, the Greek Cypriot side proposed amendments to the constitution, which were rejected by the Turkish Cypriot community. During the aftermath of this crisis, on 21 December 1963, intercommunal violence broke out between Greek and Turkish Cypriots. Nicosia was divided into Greek and Turkish Cypriot quarters with the Green Line, named after the colour of the pen used by the United Nations officer to draw the line on a map of the city. This resulted in Turkish Cypriots withdrawing from the government, and following more intercommunal violence in 1964, a number of Turkish Cypriots moved to the Turkish quarter of Nicosia, causing serious overcrowding.

On 15 July 1974, there was an attempted coup d'état led by the Greek military junta to unite the island with Greece. The coup ousted president Makarios III and replaced him with pro-enosis nationalist Nikos Sampson.

On 20 July 1974, the coup d'état precipitated the invasion of the island by the Turkish army. The operation included two phases. The second phase of the Turkish invasion was performed on 14 August 1974, where the Turkish army advanced their positions, eventually capturing a total of 37% of Cypriot territory including the northern part of Nicosia. The fighting left the island with a massive refugee problem on both sides.

On 13 February 1975, the Turkish Cypriot community declared the Turkish Federated State of Cyprus in the area occupied by Turkish forces. On 15 November 1983, Turkish Cypriots proclaimed their independence as the "Turkish Republic of Northern Cyprus", that is recognised only by Turkey and seen by the international community as a part of the Republic of Cyprus but not under its effective control.

On 23 April 2003, the Ledra Palace crossing was opened through the Green Line, the first time that crossing was allowed since 1974. This was followed by the opening of Ayios Dometios/Metehan crossing point on 9 May 2003. On 3 April 2008, the Ledra Street crossing was also reopened.

From 30 October 2016 and onwards, Nicosia became the only capital city in the world that had two time zones, after the parliament of the de facto "Turkish Republic of Northern Cyprus" abolished standard time and decided that Northern Cyprus remains at UTC+03:00 year-round, following Turkey's example. The following year, due to criticism from the Turkish Cypriot public in the north, the Turkish Cypriot government decided to go back to standard time, following the rest of Europe.

Geography

Climate
Nicosia has a hot semi-arid climate (Köppen climate classification BSh) due to its low annual precipitation totals and annual temperature range. The city experiences long, hot to sweltering, dry summers, and pleasant winters, with most of the rainfall occurring in winter. Winter precipitation is occasionally accompanied by sleet but rarely by snow. The accumulation of snow is particularly rare (last events occurred in 1950, 1974 and 1997). There is occasionally light frost during the winter nights.

Cityscape

South of the Green Line 

Ledra Street is in the middle of the walled city. The street has historically been the busiest shopping street of the capital and adjacent streets lead to the most lively part of the old city with narrow streets, boutiques, bars and art-cafés. The street today is a historic monument on its own. During the EOKA struggle that ran from 1955 to 1959, the street acquired the informal nickname The Murder Mile in reference to the frequent targeting of the British colonialists by nationalist fighters along its course. In 1963, during the outbreak of hostilities between the Greek and Turkish Cypriot communities, following the announcement of amendments to the Cypriot Constitution, Turkish Cypriots withdrew to the northern part of Nicosia which became one of the many Turkish Cypriot enclaves which existed throughout the island. Various streets which ran between the northern and southern part of the city, including Ledra Street, were blockaded. During the Turkish army invasion of Cyprus in 1974, Turkish troops occupied northern Nicosia (as well as the northern part of Cyprus). A buffer zone was established across the island along the ceasefire line to separate the northern Turkish controlled part of the island, and the south. The buffer zone runs through Ledra Street. After many failed attempts on reaching agreement between the two communities, Ledra Street was reopened on 3 April 2008.

To the east of Ledra Street, Faneromeni Square was the centre of Nicosia before 1974. It hosts a number of historical buildings and monuments including Faneromeni Church, Faneromeni School, Faneromeni Library and the Marble Mausoleum. Faneromeni Church, is a church built in 1872 in the stead of another church located at the same site, constructed with the remains of La Cava castle and a convent. There rest the archbishop and the other bishops who were executed by the Ottomans in the Saray Square during the 1821 revolt. The Palace of the Archbishop can be found at Archbishop Kyprianos Square. Although it seems very old, it is a wonderful imitation of typical Venetian style, built in 1956. Next to the palace is the late Gothic St. John's Cathedral (1665) with picturesque frescos. The square leads to Onasagorou Street, another busy shopping street in the historical centre.

The walls surrounding the old city have three gates. In The Kyrenia Gate which was responsible to the transport to the north, and especially Kyrenia, the Famagusta Gate which was responsible for the transport from Famagusta, Larnaca and Limassol and Karpasia, and the Paphos Gate for transport to the west and especially Paphos. All three gates are well-preserved. The historical centre is clearly present inside the walls, but the modern city has grown beyond.

Presently, the main square of the city is Eleftheria (Freedom) Square, with the city hall, the post office and the library. The square, which is under renovation, connects the old city with the new city where one can find the main shopping streets such as the prestigious Stasikratous Street, Themistokli Dervi Avenue and Makarios Avenue.

Nicosia is also known for its fine museums. The Archbishop's Palace contains a Byzantine museum containing the largest collection of religious icons on the island. Leventis Municipal Museum is the only historical museum of Nicosia and revives the old ways of life in the capital from ancient times up to our days. Other interesting museums include the Folk Art Museum, National Struggle Museum (witnessing the rebellion against the British administration in the 1950s), Cyprus Ethnological Museum (House of Dragoman Hadjigeorgakis Kornesios, 18th century) and the Handicrafts Centre.

Nicosia also hosts an Armenian archbishopric, a small Buddhist temple, a Maronite archbishopric, and a Roman Catholic church.

North of the Green Line 

At the center of the walled city lies the Sarayönü Square. The square has been dubbed as "the heart of Nicosia" and historically has been the cultural center of the Turkish Cypriot community. In the middle of the square stands the Venetian Column, known simply as "the Obelisk" ("Dikiltaş") to the locals and symbolic of the country's government. The column was brought from the ancient city of Salamis by the Venetians in 1550. The Girne Avenue connects Sarayönü to the Kyrenia Gate and the İnönü Square in front of it. The avenue has been described as "the symbol of the walled city", and is filled with numerous shops and restaurants.

Next to the Ledra Street checkpoint is the Arasta area. The area was pedestrianized in 2013 and is home to a network of historic shopping streets, reflecting an eastern shopping tradition with food and traditional items. Nearby Büyük Han, the largest caravanserai in the island and considered to be one of the finest buildings in Cyprus, was built in 1572 by the Ottomans and functions as a cultural center. To the west of the Girne Avenue lies the Samanbahçe neighborhood, built in the 19th century by the government, considered to be the first example of social housing in the island. Still a residential area, the neighborhood is considered to be one of the best representations of the Cypriot culture. Another central point in the walled city is the Selimiye Mosque, originally built as the St. Sophia Cathedral. The mosque is the chief religious center in Northern Cyprus. It was built between 1209 and 1228 by the Latin Church of Cyprus, in a Gothic style resembling French cathedrals. Next to the mosque is the Bedesten, a large Greek church in the Byzantine and Gothic styles, built in the 14th century. It was used as a marketplace in the Ottoman era. Today, it is used as a cultural center where various cultural activities such as concerts and festivals take place.

The quarters of Nicosia outside the walled city are more spacious than the walled city, with wider roads and junctions. These areas are characterized by multi-floor concrete buildings. In the outskirts of the city, a number large and imposing villas have been built that belong to the middle and upper-classes. The Dereboyu Avenue serves as the modern heart of the northern part and is its center of entertainment.

Politics and administration

Governance of the metropolitan area
Greater Nicosia is administered by several municipalities. In the centre is the city municipality of Nicosia itself (see below). Other municipalities are Strovolos, Lakatamia, Latsia, Aglandjia, Engomi, Agios Dhometios and the newly formed Yeri & Tseri.

The population of the conurbation is 300,000 (2011 census, plus Turkish Cypriot administered census of 2006) of which 100,000 live within the Nicosia municipal area. Because Nicosia municipality has separate communal municipal administrations, the population of Strovolos (67,904 (2011 Census)) is actually the largest of all the local authorities in Greater Nicosia.

Within Nicosia municipality, most of the population resides in the more recently annexed outlying areas of Kaimakli, Pallouriotissa, Omorfita and Ayii Omoloyites.

There is no metropolitan authority as such for Greater Nicosia and various roles, responsibilities and functions for the wider area are undertaken by the Nicosia District administration, bodies such as the Nicosia Water Board and, to some extent, Nicosia municipality.

The Nicosia Water Board supplies water to the following municipalities: Nicosia, Strovolos, Aglandjia, Engomi, Ay. Dometios, Latsia, Geri and Tseri. The board consists of three persons nominated by the Council of each municipality, plus three members appointed by the government, who are usually the District Officer of Nicosia District, who chairs the Board, the Accountant General and the Director of the Water Department. The board also supply Anthoupolis and Ergates, for whom the government provide representatives. Thus the board is in the majority controlled by the municipalities of Greater Nicosia in providing this vital local government service.

The Nicosia Sewerage Board, is likewise majority controlled by the municipalities of Greater Nicosia. It is chaired ex officio by the Mayor of Nicosia and consists of members chosen by the municipalities of Nicosia (6 members), Strovolos (5 members),
Aglandjia (2 members),
Lakatamia (2 members),
Ay. Dometios (2 members),
Engomi (2 members),
Latsia (1 member).
The sewage treatment plant is at Mia Milia. Approximately 30% of the influent is contributed by the Turkish Cypriot Side.

Public transport is not controlled by the local authorities, but comes under the Nicosia District administration, which is an arm of the Ministry of the Interior. Transport services (primarily bus and taxi) are provided by private operators such as OSEL. In late 2019 the contract for providing transport services in the district of Nicosia was awarded via tender to a private consortium which was expected to take over the system on 5 July 2020.

Nicosia Municipality

The Nicosia Municipality is responsible for all the municipal duties within the walled city and the immediately adjacent areas. The Constitution states that various main government buildings and headquarters must be situated within the Nicosia municipal boundaries. However separate municipalities are prescribed by the constitution for in the five largest towns, including Nicosia, and in the case of Nicosia the separate administration was established in 1958. The Turkish Municipal Committees (Temporary Provisions) Law, 1959 established a municipal authority run by a "Turkish Municipal Committee", defined as "the body of persons set up on or after the first day of July, 1958, in the towns of Nicosia, Limassol, Famagusta, Larnaca and Paphos by the Turkish inhabitants thereof for the purpose of performing municipal functions within the municipal limits of such towns".The "Nicosia Turkish Municipality", founded in 1958, carries out municipal duties in the northern and north-western part of city. The remaining areas, in the south and east of the city, are administered by Nicosia Municipality.

"Nicosia Turkish Municipality"

The first attempt to establish a "Nicosia Turkish Municipality" was made in 1958. In October 1959, the British Colonial Administration passed the Turkish Municipality Committees law. In 1960 with the declaration of independence of Cyprus, the Constitution of the Republic of Cyprus gave Turkish Cypriots the right to establish their own municipality. As negotiations between the two sides to establish separate municipalities failed in 1962, implementing legislation was never passed. Since the complete division of Nicosia following the Turkish Invasion in 1974, the "Nicosia Turkish Municipality" has become the de facto local authority of northern Nicosia. The "Nicosia Turkish Municipality" is a member the "Union of Cyprus Turkish Municipalities". The mayor is Mehmet Harmancı from the Communal Democracy Party.

Other municipalities in Greater Nicosia 
Until 1986 there were no suburban municipalities. Then, following the procedures in the Municipal Law 111/1985, Strovolos, Engomi, Ay. Dometios, Aglandjia, Latsia and Lakatamia were erected into municipalities. Each municipal council has the number of members described in the Municipal Law 111/1985 depending on the population figures. All members of the council are elected directly by the people for a period of 5 years.

Administrative divisions and demographics

Nicosia within the city limits is divided into 29 administrative units, according to the latest census. This unit is termed in English as quarter, neighbourhood, parish, enoria or mahalla. These units are: Ayios Andreas(formerly Tophane), Trypiotis, Nebethane, Tabakhane, Phaneromeni, Ayios Savvas, Omerie, Ayios Antonios (St. Anthony), St. John, Taht-el-kale, Chrysaliniotissa, Ayios Kassianos (Kafesli), Kaïmakli, Panayia, St Constantine & Helen, Ayioi Omoloyites, Arab Ahmet, Yeni Jami, Omorfita, Ibrahim Pasha, Mahmut Pasha, Abu Kavouk, St. Luke, Abdi Chavush, Iplik Pazar and Korkut Effendi, Ayia Sophia, Haydar Pasha, Karamanzade, and Yenişehir/Neapolis.

The municipality of Strovolos, established in 1986, is the second largest municipal authority in Cyprus in terms of population after Limassol and encompasses the southern suburbs of the capital immediately adjacent to Nicosia municipality. Lakatamia, Latsia, Geri and Aglandjia are other separate municipalities in the Nicosia metropolitan area.

The town of Gönyeli is now conurbated with the northern suburbs. Previously a village authority, it now functions as a municipality within the same area The suburbs immediately to the north of the city have not been erected into municipalities. The village authority of Hamitköy (also known as Hamid Mandres) was heavily urbanized and was included within the borders of Nicosia Turkish Municipality as a Nicosia neighbourhood headed by a muhtar. Ortakeuy Village authority has similarly been redefined as a neighbourhood of Nicosia Turkish Municipality.

Religion

Historically Nicosia is a melting pot harmonizing multiple religious establishments, denominations, churches, mosques, synagogues, etc.
Traditionally Nicosia hosts Greek Orthodox churches, Armenian Apostolic churches, Latin Catholic, Maronite Catholic, Anglican churches, Evangelical churches as well as mosques and synagogues.

Armenian Apostolic Church

One of the oldest Armenian churches known as the Benedictine Abbey of Our Lady of Tyre, was founded in the 13th century as a principal convent following the fall of Jerusalem. In 1308, the Lusignan king, Henry II of Jerusalem, repaired the church after it was destroyed by an earthquake. As many of the nuns were Armenian in origin, it came under the Armenian Church before 1504.
Since 1963, the church has been located in North Nicosia, under Turkish Cypriot administration. The church suffered the collapse of some parts and a great deterioration of condition till 2007, when the restoration work began.
The renovation was completed in 2013 and won the EU Prize For Cultural Heritage (Europa Nostra Award) in 2015.
With the help of the World Council of Churches, the Church of Westphalia, the Cyprus government and the faithful, a new church was built in Strovolos, also called "Sourp Asdvadzadzin". Its foundation stone was laid on 25 September 1976 by Archbishop Makarios III and Archbishop Nerses Pakhdigian. It was officially inaugurated on 22 November 1981 by Catholicos of Cilicia Khoren I and Coadjutor Catholicos of Cilicia Karekin II, in the presence of Archbishop Chrysostomos I, Bishop Zareh Aznavorian and Representative Dr. Antranik L. Ashdjian.

Maronite Catholic Church

The Maronite community is a traditional community in Nicosia. The archeparchy extends its jurisdiction over all the faithful Maronites of the island of Cyprus. Its arcieparchial seat is the city of Nicosia, where is located the Our Lady of Grace Cathedral (Nicosia).

The archeparchy at the end of 2013 out of a population of 838,897 people had 10,400 baptized, corresponding to 1.2% of the total. Its territory is divided into 12 parishes.
Our Lady of Grace Cathedral is the main Maronite church of the city of Nicosia, in Cyprus, and is the cathedral of the Maronite Catholic Archeparchy of Cyprus.

The first cathedral was dedicated to St. John, but during the Ottoman occupation it was turned into a mosque. The Lebanese Maronite community erected the church of Santa Croce, later entrusted to the Franciscans, and the current church of Our Lady of Grace is near to the Franciscan church. In 1960, the seat of the vicarage and the surrounding buildings were built.
On 6 June 2010 Pope Benedict XVI, the first pope to make an apostolic trip to the island, visited the cathedral of Nicosia.

Anglican Church

The church of St. Paul was built in 1893 when Cyprus was a protectorate of the British Empire. The influence of politics on architecture is evident by the structural elements of the building, which is reminiscent of an English parish church. The Christian church today is part of the Diocese of Cyprus and the Gulf.

Greek Evangelical Church

The Greek Evangelical Church of Nicosia is a relatively modern architecture serving the local Protestant community. Along with special hours dedicated to services of the Greek Evangelical community, it serves as a worship center of local Protestants of other nationalities, such as Armenian, American, Romanian, Korean, Chinese, etc. It is located on Gladstone Street.

Armenian Evangelical Church

The first Armenian Evangelicals in Cyprus came after the arrival of the British in July 1878. As they were not committed, and very few, they quickly became associated with the Mother Church (Armenian Apostolic Church), such as Apisoghom Utidjian, the official state documents translator - and the son of Stepan Utidjian, one of the original founders of the Armenian Evangelical Church -, who served as Chairman of the Nicosia parish council for 30 years. With the influx of more Protestants, Armenian Evangelicals became affiliated with the Reformed Presbyterian Church as early as 1887. Although the main centres were Nicosia and Larnaca, gatherings were occasionally held in Limassol, Famagusta and Amiandos.
There was also a small Armenian Evangelical church, located in Mahmoud Pasha street, in the Turkish-occupied part of the walled city of Nicosia—behind the old American Academy building, near the Arab Ahmed mosque. Prior to its erection, Armenian Evangelicals used to worship God at the Reformed Presbyterian church on Apostolos Varnavas street, opposite the old Powerhouse and behind the building of the Holy Archbishopric of Cyprus. The church - a vision already since the early 1930s - was eventually built thanks to the initiative of pastor Yohanna Der Megerditchian, with the financial contribution of the Reformed Presbyterian Church and the Armenian Evangelical faithful; its architect was Dickran H. Davidian. Its foundation stone was laid on 28 July 1946 by pastor Yohanna der Megerditchian, who dedicated it on 1 July 1947. On the lower part of the right wall to the side of the entrance there is an inscription in Armenian.

Converted Churches

Perhaps the most iconic religious architecture of Nicosia is the Cathedral of Saint Sophia, also known as the Agia Sophia of Nicosia, which was constructed in the year of 1326 as a Catholic church.  It was converted into a mosque and it is located in North Nicosia. It has historically been the main mosque of the city. As a mosque it is known as the Selimiye Mosque which is housed in the largest and oldest surviving Gothic church in Cyprus possibly constructed on the site of an earlier Byzantine church.
During the 50-day Ottoman siege of the city in 1570, the cathedral provided refuge for a great number of people. When the city fell on 9 September, Francesco Contarini, the Bishop of Paphos, delivered the last Christian sermon in the building, in which he asked for divine help and exhorted the people. The cathedral was stormed by Ottoman soldiers, who broke the door and killed the bishop along with others. They smashed or threw out Christian items, such as furniture and ornaments in the cathedral and destroyed the choir as well as the nave. Then, they washed the interior of the mosque to make it ready for the first Friday prayer that it would host on 15 September, which was attended by the commander Lala Mustafa Pasha and saw the official conversion of the cathedral into a mosque. During the same year, the two minarets were added, as well as Islamic features such as the mihrab and the minbar.

The first imam of the mosque was Moravizade Ahmet Efendi, who hailed from the Morea province of the Ottoman Empire. All imams maintained the tradition of climbing the stairs to the minbar before Friday sermons while leaning on a sword used during the conquest of Nicosia to signify that Nicosia was captured by conquest.

Following its conversion, the mosque became the property of the Sultan Selim Foundation, which was responsible for maintaining it. Other donors formed a number of foundations to help with the maintenance. Okçuzade Mehmed Paşa, a governor of Cyprus in the 16th century, donated a shop to provide income for the Sultan Selim Foundation; other donations include estates in the countryside and other shops. The foundation employed trustees (mütevelli) to look after the funds and transferred 40,000 akçe annually to Medina in late 16th century. During the Ottoman period, it was the largest mosque in the whole island, and was used weekly by the Ottoman governor, administrators and elite for the Friday prayers. In the late 18th century, a large procession that consisted of the leading officials in the front on horseback, followed by lower-ranking officials on foot, came to the mosque every Friday.

Islam

Historically Nicosia (south and north) hosts over 15 mosques, either originally constructed as such or converted from a church.
The Ömeriye Mosque, formerly known as the Augustinian Church of Saint Mary is a mosque in the walled city of Nicosia on the island of Cyprus, currently located in the south section of Nicosia. Following the Turkish invasion of Cyprus, the mosque gained significance as one of the most important sites of Muslim worship in the non-Muslim section of the island and the city.
Currently, the mosque is functioning and open for both worshippers and visitors.

Formerly, the site of the mosque was occupied by the Augustinian Church of Saint Mary, which dated back to the 14th century. During the Ottoman-Venetian War of 1570-73, the church was first heavily damaged during the siege of Nicosia in 1570, and was eventually levelled after the war.

After the Turkish conquest of Cyprus, Lala Mustafa Pasha, the Ottoman commander, ordered a mosque to be built on the site of the former church, based on a popular belief that Umar, second caliph of Islam, was buried at this site in 7th century.

According to Turkish Cypriot folklore, the Ömeriye Mosque is the first mosque where Turks prayed on the island following its conquest in 1571.

Culture

The Cyprus Museum is the largest and oldest archaeological museum in Cyprus. In old Nicosia, the Ethnological Museum (Hadjigeorgakis Kornesios Mansion) is the most important example of surviving urban architecture of the late Ottoman rule. Today, the mansion which was awarded the Europa Nostra prize for its exemplary renovation work, functions as a museum where a collection of artifacts from the Byzantine, Medieval and Ottoman periods are displayed. Other museums in Nicosia include the Cyprus Museum of Natural History and the Leventis Municipal Museum of Nicosia and Von World Pens Hall in the south. In the north, the Dervish Pasha Mansion, similar in architecture to the Hadjigeorgakis Kornesios Mansion, serves as an ethnological museum, displaying Ottoman and archaeological artifacts. Other museums include the Lusignan House, the Mevlevi Tekke Museum, associated with the sect of the Whirling Dervishes, and the Lapidary Museum.

Art galleries in Nicosia include the Leventis Gallery, which hosts over 800 paintings from Cypriot, Greek or European artists.

Nicosia offers a wide variety of musical and theatrical events, organized either by the municipality or independent organizations. Halls and theatres used for this purpose include:
The Cyprus National Theatre, which contains two performance spaces:
the 550-seat Lyric Theater with a bold exterior but an intimate theatrical environment. Its design minimizes the distance from actor to audience;
the 150-seat New Theater, which is an open-ended workshop space, with simple galleries around the room. The stage can be set in the center, at the ends, or to one side of the room, and the space can be opened to the private garden beyond.
The Pallas Cinema-Theatre which was renovated from a near derelict state in 2008.
Theatro Ena
Maskarini Theatre
Dionysos Theatre
Melina Mercouri Hall 
Theatro Dentro
Nicosia's universities also boast an impressive array of facilities, and many churches and outdoor spaces are used to host cultural events. The Near East University hosts the Atatürk Cultural and Conference Centre, with 700 seats.

Nicosia hosted the Miss Universe 2000 pageant.

In June 2011, Nicosia launched a failed campaign to become the European Capital of Culture for 2017.

Education

Nicosia has a large student community as it is the seat of five universities, the University of Cyprus (UCY), the University of Nicosia, the European University Cyprus, the Open University of Cyprus and Frederick University.

Nicosia is also home to the one of the largest historic Armenian schools, the Melkonian Educational Institute established in 1926 which operated until 2005. The Melkonian Institution was created as an orphanage in the aftermath of the Armenian Genocide of 1915–1923.

Economy

Nicosia is the financial and business heart of Cyprus. The city hosts the headquarters of all Cypriot banks namely the former Cyprus Popular Bank (also known as Laiki Bank), Bank of Cyprus, the Hellenic Bank. Further, the Central Bank of Cyprus is located in the Acropolis area of the Cypriot capital. A number of international businesses base their Cypriot headquarters in Nicosia, such as the big four audit firms PWC, Deloitte, KPMG and Ernst & Young. International technology companies such as NCR and TSYS have their regional headquarters in Nicosia. The city is also home to local financial newspapers such as the Financial Mirror and Stockwatch. Cyprus Airways had its head offices in the entrance of Makariou Avenue. According to a recent UBS survey in August 2011, Nicosia is the wealthiest per capita city of the Eastern Mediterranean and the tenth richest city in the world by purchasing power in 2011.

Transport

Nicosia is linked with other major cities in Cyprus via a modern motorway network. The A1 connects Nicosia with Limassol in the south with the A6 going from Limassol onto Paphos.
The A2 links Nicosia with the south eastern city of Larnaca with the A3 going from Larnaca to Ayia Napa. The A9 connects Nicosia to the west Nicosia district villages and the Troodos mountains. The capital is also linked to the 2 international airports: Larnaca International Airport and Paphos International Airport. (Nicosia International Airport ceased commercial operations in 1974; it is located within the Green Line buffer zone, and is used as the headquarters of the United Nations Peacekeeping Force in Cyprus.)

Public transport within the city is served by a new bus service. Bus services in Nicosia are run by OSEL. In the northern part, the company of LETTAŞ provides this service. Many taxi companies operate in Nicosia. Fares are regulated by law and taxi drivers are obliged to use a taximeter.

In 2010, as part of the Nicosia Integrated Mobility Plan, a pre-feasibility study for a proposed tram network has taken place and sponsored by the Ministry of Communications and Works. The study compared two scenarios, with and without the operation of a tramway in terms of emitted polluting loads.

In 2011, the Nicosia Municipality introduced the Bike in Action scheme, a bicycle sharing system which covers the Greater Nicosia area. The scheme is run by the Inter-Municipal Bicycle Company of Nicosia (DEPL).

There is no train network in Cyprus. Plans for the creation of an intercity railway are under way. The first railway line on the island was the Cyprus Government Railway which operated from 1905 to 1951. It was closed down due to financial reasons.

Sports

Football is the most popular sport in Cyprus, and Nicosia is home of three major teams of the island; APOEL, Omonia and Olympiakos. APOEL and Omonia are dominant in Cypriot football. There are also many other football clubs in Nicosia and the suburbs. The city also hosts Çetinkaya, Yenicami, Küçük Kaymaklı and Gönyeli, four of the major Turkish Cypriot clubs. Nicosia is also home to AGBU Ararat Nicosia FC, the island's only Armenian FC.

Nicosia is also the home for many clubs for basketball, handball and other sports. APOEL and Omonia have basketball and volleyball sections and Keravnos is one of the major basketball teams of the island. The Gymnastic Club Pancypria (GSP), the owner of the Neo GSP Stadium, is one of the major athletics clubs of the island. Also, all teams in the Futsal First Division are from Nicosia. In addition, two handball teams, European University and SPE Strovolou, are located in Nicosia.

Nicosia has some of the biggest venues in the island; the Neo GSP Stadium, with capacity of 23,400, is the home for the national team, APOEL, Olympiakos and Omonia. Makario Stadium has a capacity of 16,000. In the north, the Nicosia Atatürk Stadium has a capacity of 28,000.
The Eleftheria Indoor Hall is the biggest basketball stadium in Cyprus, with capacity of 6,500 seats and is the home for
the national team, APOEL and Omonia.
The Lefkotheo indoor arena is the volleyball stadium for APOEL and Omonia.

In Nicosia in 2010 and 2012. took place Nicosia Marathon, organized by Athanasios Ktorides Foundation, and attracted more than 7,000 participants.

Nicosia hosted the 2000 ISSF World Cup Final shooting events for the shotgun. Also the city hosted two basketball events; the European Saporta Cup in 1997 and the 2005 FIBA Europe All Star Game in the Eleftheria Indoor Hall. Another event which was hosted in Nicosia were the Games of the Small States of Europe in 1989 and 2009.

Notable people

 Peter I of Cyprus (1328–1369), King of Cyprus
 Kıbrıslı Mehmed Kamil Pasha (1833–1913), Grand Vizier of the Ottoman Empire
 Fazıl Küçük (1906–1984), former Vice President of the Republic of Cyprus (1960–1963)
 Glafkos Klerides (1919–2013), former President of the Republic of Cyprus (1993–2003)
 Tassos Papadopoulos (1934–2008), former President of the Republic of Cyprus (2003–2008)
 Marios Garoyian, former President of the House of Representatives of Cyprus (2008–2011)
 Benon Sevan, Assistant Secretary-General of the United Nations (1992–2005) and the Head of the Oil for Food program (1996–2005)
 Nicos Tornaritis, politician and jurist, member of the House of Representatives and Consultant of the Republic of Cyprus
 Neoklis Kyriazis (1877–1956), historian and member of the National Council of Cyprus
 Alparslan Türkeş (1917–1997), Turkish nationalist politician, founder of the Nationalist Movement Party in Turkey
 Kutlu Adalı (1935–1996), journalist, poet and socio-political researcher and peace advocate
 Christopher A. Pissarides, Nobel Prize winner in Economics
 Mustafa Djamgoz, professor of cancer biology at Imperial College London
 Manoug Parikian (1920–1987), violinist and violin professor in the UK
 Suat Günsel (b.1952), businessman and founder of the Near East University
 Nicolas Economou (1953–1993), concert pianist, composer, arranger, conductor and organizer of music festivals
 Mick Karn (1958–2011), musician, bassist of the pop group Japan
 Sevgül Uludağ (b.1958), journalist, activist
 Alkinoos Ioannidis (b.1969), singer
 Michalis Hatzigiannis (b.1978), singer
 Michael Bisping (b.1979), MMA fighter
 Diam's (b.1980), French rap singer
 Stephanie Solomonides (b.1982), first Cypriot to reach North and South Poles
 Giorgos Papadopoulos (b.1985), composer, singer
 Hovig (b.1989), singer, represented Cyprus at the Eurovision Song Contest 2017
 Hazar Ergüçlü (b.1992), actress on the Turkish drama Medcezir
 Aleksandar Vezenkov (b.1995), basketball player

Twin towns – sister cities
Nicosia is twinned with:

 Athens, Greece (1988)
 Bucharest, Romania (2004)
 Doha, Qatar
 Odesa, Ukraine (1996)
 Shiraz, Iran (1999)

Friendly cities

Nicosia also cooperates with:
 Schwerin, Germany (1974)
 Shanghai, China (1999)

See also

 North Nicosia
 List of divided cities
 United Nations Peacekeeping Force in Cyprus
 Nicosia Music Society
 List of shopping malls in Cyprus

References

 Nicosia Municipality (south) website
 Nicosia Municipality (north) website
 Nicosia Municipality website – Transportation
 Cyprus Island – Nicosia
 The World of Cyprus bilingual information portal with background on folk culture and Byzantine influences

Bibliography

External links

 English-language website for Municipality of Nicosia (Λευκωσια)

Old maps of Nicosia, Historic Cities site
 Nicosia Tourism Board

 
Capitals in Asia
Capitals in Europe
Divided cities
Historic sites in Cyprus
Fortified settlements
Municipalities in Nicosia District